General elections were held in Guinea on 1 January 1968 to elect a President and National Assembly. The country was a one-party state at the time, with the Democratic Party of Guinea – African Democratic Rally as the sole legal party. Its leader Ahmed Sékou Touré was re-elected President unopposed, whilst in the National Assembly elections the party produced a list of 75 candidates for the 75 seats, which voters were asked to approve. Voter turnout was 99.7%.

Results

President

National Assembly

References

Presidential elections in Guinea
Guinea
General election
One-party elections
Single-candidate elections
Guinean general election